Md. Joynal Abedin Bhuiyan is an Awami League politician and the former Member of Parliament of Comilla-11.

Career
Bhuiyan was elected to parliament from Comilla-16 as an Awami League candidate in 1979.

Bhuiyan was elected to parliament from Comilla-11 as an Awami League candidate in 1996.

Death 
Bhuiyan died on 27 January 2005.

References

Awami League politicians
7th Jatiya Sangsad members
2nd Jatiya Sangsad members
Year of birth missing (living people)
2005 deaths